TSG 1899 Hoffenheim II is the reserve team of German association football club TSG 1899 Hoffenheim, based in Hoffenheim, Baden-Württemberg. The team has been playing in the tier four Regionalliga since 2010.

History
With the rise of the first team the club's reserve side, TSG 1899 Hoffenheim II, started to climb through the ranks, too. It entered the Verbandsliga Baden in 2001, only a year after the senior team had won this league, and won promotion to the Oberliga Baden-Württemberg in its second season there after coming second in the Verbandsliga.

After seven seasons in the Oberliga where it gradually improved season by season the team won promotion to the Regionalliga Süd after a league title in 2010. With the disbanding of the Regionalliga Süd in 2012 Hoffenheim II became part of the new Regionalliga Südwest.

Players

Current squad

Staff

Honours
The club's honours:
 Oberliga Baden-Württemberg (V)
 Champions: 2010
 Runners-up: 2009
 Verbandsliga Nordbaden (V)
 Runners-up: 2002, 2003
 Landesliga Nordbaden II
 Champions: 2001

Recent seasons
The recent season-by-season performance of the club:

 With the introduction of the Regionalligas in 1994 and the 3. Liga in 2008 as the new third tier, below the 2. Bundesliga, all leagues below dropped one tier. In 2012, the number of Regionalligas was increased from three to five with all Regionalliga Süd clubs except the Bavarian ones entering the new Regionalliga Südwest.

Key

References

External links
  (German and English available)
 TSG 1899 Hoffenheim II at Weltfussball.de 
 TSG 1899 Hoffenheim II at fupa.net 

II
German reserve football teams
Baden-Württemberg reserve football teams